The 87th Regiment of Foot (Keith's Highlanders) was a Scottish infantry regiment in the British Army, formed in 1759 and disbanded in 1763.

History
The regiment was raised at Perth as Keith's Highlanders by Robert Murray Keith who regimented three companies detached from the 42nd Regiment of Foot in August 1759. It was numbered as the 87th Regiment of Foot in 1760. The regiment was immediately dispatched to Germany, where it fought at the Battle of Warburg in July 1760 and the Battle of Villinghausen later that month. It returned home later in the year but was deployed to Holland in November 1762. It returned to Scotland in December 1762 and was disbanded at Perth in July 1763.

References

External links
87th Highlanders

Military units and formations disestablished in 1763
1759 establishments in Scotland
History of Perth and Kinross
Infantry regiments of the British Army
Military units and formations established in 1759
Scottish regiments